The 1875 Ohio gubernatorial election was held on October 12, 1875. Republican nominee Rutherford B. Hayes defeated Democratic incumbent William Allen with 50.25% of the vote. Hayes had previously served as Governor from 1868 to 1872, when he beat Allen's nephew Allen G. Thurman in his initial election.

General election

Candidates
Major party candidates
Rutherford B. Hayes, Republican 
William Allen, Democratic

Other candidates
Jay Odell, Prohibition

Results

References

1875
Ohio
Rutherford B. Hayes